Anvil Is Anvil is the sixteenth studio album by Canadian heavy metal band Anvil. It was produced by Martin Pfeiffer and was released on February 26, 2016. It is the first Anvil album to feature bassist Chris Robertson.

Track listing

Personnel 
 Anvil
 Steve "Lips" Kudlow – vocals, guitars
 Chris Robertson – bass
 Robb "Robbo" Reiner – drums

 Production
 Martin "Mattes" Pfeiffer – producer, engineer, mixing
 Holger Thielbörger – editing
 Jacob Hansen – mastering at Hansen Studios, Ribe, Denmark

Charts

References 

2016 albums
Anvil (band) albums
SPV/Steamhammer albums